The 1982–83 Australian region cyclone season was the third-latest starting Australian season on record, only behind 1987 and 2020. Was a below average tropical cyclone season. It officially started on 1 November 1982, and officially ended on 30 April 1983.



Seasonal summary

Systems

Severe Tropical Cyclone Jane

Jane formed on January 2, 1983, near Indonesia. The storm moved southward where it reached Category 1 status on the same day. Jane did a small loop before continuing south-eastward. Jane reached Category 4 status before making landfall east of Port Hedland, Western Australia. Jane then dissipated after January 10.

Tropical Cyclone Des

A tropical depression developed within a monsoon trough east-northeast of Cairns, Queensland, on 14 January. Des moved east-southeastward and strengthened gradually. Later, the storm tracked generally northward, until curving eastward and dissipating on 23 January.

Severe Tropical Cyclone Elinor

In March 1983, Cyclone Elinor made landfall in Queensland, wrecking two yachts.

Severe Tropical Cyclone Ken

Ken formed on February 28, 1983, several hundred miles north of Australia. The storm briefly reached Category 3 status before making landfall in the sparsely populated area. The storm dissipated well inland by March 6.

Severe Tropical Cyclone Lena

Lena formed off the coast of Indonesia on April 3, 1983. The storm reached Category 2 status before making landfall at Port Hedland, Australia. The storm dissipated on April 9.

Severe Tropical Cyclone Naomi

A tropical low developed near the western edge of the Australia region basin on 21 April. After strengthening into Cyclone Naomi, the system headed southeastward for much of its duration. By 30 April, Naomi doubled-back and moved northwestward, but dissipated on 2 May.

Severe Tropical Cyclone Monty

The final cyclone of the season, Monty, developed from a weak tropical low on 22 April. Moving generally southward, Monty dissipated on 29 April.

See also
Atlantic hurricane seasons: 1982, 1983, 
Eastern Pacific hurricane seasons: 1982, 1983
Western Pacific typhoon seasons: 1982, 1983
North Indian Ocean cyclone seasons: 1982, 1983

References

Australian region cyclone seasons
Aust
1982 AUS
1983 AUS